Ryan Flood (born October 17, 1998) is an American soccer player who currently plays as a left back for League of Ireland Premier Division club Finn Harps.

Career 
After a season in the UPSL with Sporting Arizona in 2018, Flood traveled to Brazil and Japan in pursuit of a professional soccer career. He returned in 2019 to play in the NPSL with FC Arizona.

On March 31, 2021, Flood signed his first fully professional contract with USL Championship side Phoenix Rising. He made his professional debut on April 30, 2021, starting in a 4–1 win over San Diego Loyal.

In January 2022, Flood was re-signed by the club for another season, as his option was activated.

On January 12, 2023, Flood joined Irish club Finn Harps on a permanent deal, signing a two-year contract in the process.

References

External links 
 
 

1998 births
Living people
American soccer players
Soccer players from Scottsdale, Arizona
Association football defenders
FC Arizona players
Phoenix Rising FC players
Finn Harps F.C. players
National Premier Soccer League players
USL Championship players
United Premier Soccer League players
American expatriate sportspeople in Ireland
Expatriate sportspeople in Ireland
American expatriate soccer players